Semigallian, or Zemgalian, was an Eastern Baltic language of the Baltic language sub-family of the Indo-European languages.

History 
It was spoken in the northern part of Lithuania and southern regions of Latvia in what is known as Semigallia. It is thought that it was extinct by the 16th century, with the assimilation by the Latvians. Semigallian is known only from references to it in documents and texts from before the 16th century.

Phonology 
Semigallian shares some phonological similarities to Curonian and, to a lesser extent, Latvian. The Common Baltic ,  consonants became ,  in their soft varieties in Semigalian. All long vowels and diphthongs at the end of the word in Common Baltic were reduced to simple short vowels in Semigallian.

References

East Baltic languages
Medieval languages
Extinct Baltic languages
Extinct languages of Europe